Thomas James Robertson (August 3, 1823October 13, 1897) was a United States senator from South Carolina. Born near Winnsboro, he completed preparatory studies and graduated from South Carolina College (now the University of South Carolina) at Columbia in 1843. He engaged in planting and owned slaves. He was a member of the State constitutional convention in 1865.

Upon the readmission of the State of South Carolina to representation in 1868, Robertson was elected as a Republican to the U.S. Senate; he was reelected in 1871 and served from July 15, 1868, to March 4, 1877, and was not a candidate for reelection. While in the Senate he was chairman of the Committee on Manufactures (Forty-second through Forty-fourth Congresses). He retired from public life and active business due to ill health, and in 1897 died in Columbia. Interment was in Elmwood Cemetery.

References

External links 
 
New York Times article Attitude of President Grant Toward the Robbers
 New York Times article South Carolina Senatorial elections
Bio of son Edwin Wales Robertson 

1823 births
1897 deaths
People from Fairfield County, South Carolina
American people of Scottish descent
Republican Party United States senators from South Carolina
American slave owners
19th-century American politicians
University of South Carolina alumni
United States senators who owned slaves